Nádraží Holešovice is a Prague Metro station on Line C, serving the Holešovice mainline railway station.

The station was formerly known as Fučíkova, after journalist Julius Fučík. The station was opened on 3 November 1984 as the northern terminus of the extension from Sokolovská (later renamed Florenc), a status it retained until 26 June 2004 when the line was extended to Ládví station.

The station has two exits - the southern exit on Plynární street leads to tram stops and a local bus station, and the northern exit on Vrbenského street leads to the mainline and suburban railway station and a long-distance bus station.

References

External links 

 Gallery 

Prague Metro stations
Railway stations opened in 1984
1984 establishments in Czechoslovakia
Prague 7
Railway stations in the Czech Republic opened in the 20th century